The Latin Grammy Awards (stylized as Latin GRAMMYs) are an award presented by the Latin Recording Academy to recognize outstanding achievement in the Latin music industry. The Latin Grammy honors works recorded in Spanish or Portuguese from anywhere around the world that has been released in Ibero-America. Ibero-America, as defined by the Latin Recording Academy, encompasses Latin America, Spain, Portugal, and the Latino community in Canada and the United States. Submissions of products recorded in languages, dialects or idiomatic expressions recognized in Ibero America, such as Catalan, Basque, Galician, Valencian, Nahuatl, Guarani, Quechua or Mayan may be accepted by a majority vote. Both the regular Grammy Award and the Latin Grammy Award have similar nominating and voting processes, in which the selections are decided by peers within the Latin music industry.

The first annual Latin Grammys ceremony was held at the Staples Center in Los Angeles on September 13, 2000. Broadcast by CBS, that first ceremony became the first primarily Spanish language primetime program carried on an English language American television network. The 23rd Annual Latin Grammy Awards was held on November 17, 2022 at Michelob Ultra Arena in Las Vegas.

Since 2005, the awards have been broadcast in the United States by Univision. In 2013, 9.8 million people watched the Latin Grammy Awards on Univision, making the channel a top-three network for the night in the U.S.

History
The Latin Academy of Recording Arts & Sciences (now The Latin Recording Academy) was formed by the National Academy of Recording Arts & Sciences (now The Recording Academy) in 1997. It was founded by Michael Greene and Producers & Songwriters Rudy Pérez & Mauricio Abaroa. Rudy Pérez was the Grammy Florida chapter's first President of the Board. The concept of a separate Grammy Awards for Latin music began in 1989. According to organizers, the Latin Grammy Awards was established as the Latin music universe was deemed too large to fit on the Grammy Awards. The Latin Recording Academy defines Latin music as music in Spanish or Portuguese. The Latin Grammy Awards mainly encompasses music released in Latin America, Spain, Portugal and the Latino United States. In 2000, it was announced that the 1st Annual Latin Grammy Awards would take place at the Staples Center on September 13, 2000. On July 7, 2000, the nominations were announced in Miami, Florida, United States. The Latin Grammys were introduced with over 39 categories included limited to Spanish and Portuguese-speaking recordings. The first telecast took place at the Staples Center and was broadcast. The following year's show was canceled due to the September 11, 2001 attacks, which was the same day the show was to take place. In 2002, the academy elected its first independent Board of Trustees. In 2005, the broadcast was moved from CBS to Univision where the whole telecast was in Spanish.

Voting members live in various regions in the US and outside of the US including Latin America and Iberia. For a recording to be eligible for a nomination, it must have at least 51% of its content recorded in Spanish or Portuguese and commercially released in North America, Central America, South America, the Caribbean, Spain, or Portugal. Products recorded in languages and dialects from Ibero-America such as Catalan, Basque, Galician, Valencian, Nahuatl, Guarani, Quechua or Mayan may be accepted by majority vote of the committees of the Latin Recording Academy. The Latin Recording Academy also accepts Latin instrumental music from Ibero-America as well as compositions that have been composed or interpreted by an Iberian American musician. The eligibility period is June 1 to May 30 for a respective awards ceremony. Recordings are first entered and then reviewed to determine the awards they are eligible for. Following that, nominating ballots are mailed to voting members of the academy. The votes are tabulated and the five recordings in each category with the most votes become the nominees. Final voting ballots are sent out to voting members and the winners are determined. Winners are later announced at the Latin Grammy Awards. The current President & CEO of the Latin Academy of Recording Arts & Sciences is Manuel Abud, who succeeded Gabriel Abaroa in 2021.

Altogether there are three events: the Life Achievement when renowned artists are honored for lifetime achievement; Person of the Year, when one artist is honored at a gala dinner, and Grammy itself, an award that brings together artists from all over Latin America and Iberia and that today is broadcast live to 80 countries, including Brazil, by channel Univision (TNT in Brazil).

Awards

Award categories 

Alike from the Grammy Award there is a general field consisting of four genre-less award categories:

Record of the Year is awarded to the performer and the production team of a single song.
Album of the Year is awarded to the performer and the production team of a full album.
Song of the Year is awarded to the writer(s)/composer(s) of a single song.
Best New Artist is awarded to an artist without reference to a song or album.

The rest of the fields are genre-specific. Special non-competitive awards are also given out for more long-lasting contributions to the Latin music industry.

Ceremonies

Leading winners

With 21 Latin Grammy Awards, Calle 13 have won the most Latin Grammy Awards. Juanes, with 19 Latin Grammy Awards, holds the record for most awards won by a solo artist. Natalia Lafourcade is the biggest winner among female artists with 13 awards.

TV broadcasts and ratings

Criticism
As with its Grammy Awards counterpart, the Latin Grammy Awards has also received criticism from various recording artists and music journalists.

Upon the announcement of the Latin Grammy Awards in 1999, several musical journalists raised concerns about the awards being used as a marketing tool by the mainstream media. Manny S. Gonzalez of the Vista En L.A felt that the award would just be used to advertise artists being promoted by Emilio Estefan. The lack of categories for non Spanish and Portuguese-speaking music has been criticized, namely by artists who consider their work to be "Latin" in sound or origin but are not eligible for a Latin Grammy including those from Haiti (who have compared their compas music to merengue music from the Dominican Republic but is sung in French Creole) and Celtic musicians from the Galicia and Asturias regions of Spain. The linguistic requirement has also been criticized by Tony Succar whose album, Unity: The Latin Tribute to Michael Jackson, was not eligible for a Latin Grammy Award despite the album being recorded in salsa music. In response to the criticism, a spokesman for the Latin Recording Academy stated: "The Latin Recording Academy considers music based on the contents of the recording itself -- the technical elements that go into the art of music making -- not based on how a recording or an artist is marketed externally." In 2001, Cuban exiles living in Miami protested at the Latin Grammy Awards for allowing musicians living in Cuba to perform at the stage. This resulted in the Latin Grammys being moved to Los Angeles for the second annual awards (which would in the end be canceled in the aftermath of the September 11 attacks).

In October 2010, a year in which he did not have any new works eligible for the 11th Annual Latin Grammy Awards, Venezuelan singer-songwriter Franco De Vitaa previous nomineecalled the Latin Grammys "fake and a lie" and stated that if he were to ever win an award, he would not accept it. The following year, he won his first two Latin Grammy Awards, at the 12th Annual Latin Grammy Awards. American musician Willie Colón observed the relationship between the Latin Grammys and major Latin record labels. Mexican singer-songwriter Aleks Syntek noted that Mexican artists in general were apathetic towards the awards. The Latin Grammys was met with backlash at the 2019 awards ceremony when none of the urbano artists were nominated in the general categories despite its popularity. This led to several reggaeton artists, including Daddy Yankee and J Balvin, boycotting the event. The Latin Recording Academy responded to criticism by requesting the "leaders of the urban community to get involved with the Academy, to get involved with the process, and to get involved with discussions that improve the Academy." Since the late 2010s, the inclusion of artists from Spain in the awards has garnered controversy from social media users who noted the Spanish colonization of the Americas and the Academy itself has been accused of whitewashing by favoring Spaniards and White Latin Americans over Afro–Latin Americans (who were the main contributors of many Latin music genres including the urbano field such as reggaeton). Abud has responded to criticism on the inclusion of Spain by pointing out that "Latin music has been defined by Spanish and Portuguese".

Ceremony locations

The Latin Grammy Awards are held annually in Las Vegas. The ceremony has been held there annually since 2009 and was first held there in 2007. The ceremony spent its first few years being held in Los Angeles and in 2003 took place in Miami. The ceremony had also been held once in New York City and Houston. In Las Vegas the ceremony has been held at three different venues over the years; the Michelob Ultra Arena, the MGM Grand Garden Arena and the T-Mobile Arena.

The 24th Annual Latin Grammy Awards in 2023 will be held in Seville, Spain which will mark the first time the awards have been held outside of the United States.

See also
List of Grammy Award categories § Latin

Notes

References

Further reading 
"Spanish broadcast for Latin Grammys". (November 5, 2005). New Straits Times, p. 26.

External links

The Latin Recording Academy Official Site

 
Latin music awards
Awards established in 2000
Spanish-language music
Lusophone music
2000 establishments in the United States